The flag of Malawi (Chichewa: mbendera ya Malaŵi) was officially adopted on 6 July 1964 when the colony of Nyasaland became independent from British rule and renamed itself Malawi.

Design
The first flag of independent Malawi was adopted on 6 July 1964. A rising sun against a black field is also present in the coat of arms of Malawi and in the flag it officially represents the dawn of hope and freedom for the continent of Africa (when the flag was created, more countries in Africa were gaining independence from European rule). The 31 rays of the sun represent the fact that Malawi was the 31st African nation at the time of its independence. The black represents the indigenous people of the continent, the red symbolises the blood of their struggle, and the green represents nature. The flag resembles the Pan-African flag designed by Marcus Garvey's Universal Negro Improvement Association, with the red and black bands reversed and a red sun at the top.

It also resembles the flag of the now-defunct Republic of Biafra and the national flag of Afghanistan used from 1973 to 1992.

2010–2012
A new flag of Malawi was adopted on  2010, as proposed by the Democratic Progressive Party–led government. The stripes were altered from the previous flag to match the original Pan-African Flag layout, with the red stripe at the top, the black stripe in middle, and the green stripe at the bottom. The rising sun at the flag's top was replaced with a full, centred white sun with 45 rays representing the "economic progress" Malawi has made since becoming independent (it was actually one of the most unsuccessful in the world after 1990). The opposition United Democratic Front announced that it would challenge the legitimacy of flag change in court. The flag was endorsed by the President of Malawi, Bingu wa Mutharika, who approved the flag change on 29 July 2010. There was much public outcry about whether there was a need to change the flag, but the process continued despite being unwelcome to much of the public. The flag was pejoratively nicknamed "Bingu's flag" by the majority of the nation who saw it as an illegitimate flag. Many objected to the new flag, perceiving its adoption as undemocratic.

On 28 May 2012, under new president Joyce Banda, Parliament voted to revert to the independence flag.

Flag colours
The colours of the flag are defined using British Standard colours; these are the same colours as used on the Kenyan flag:

Gallery

References

Flag
Flags of Africa
Flags introduced in 1964
Flags introduced in 2012
Malawi